Mount Coleman is a rounded mountain,  high, standing immediately east of Commonwealth Glacier at the head of New Harbour in Victoria Land. It was mapped by the British Antarctic Expedition, 1910–13, under Robert Falcon Scott, and named by C. S. Wright, a member of the expedition, for Professor A. P. Coleman, geologist, of Toronto University, Canada.

References
 

Mountains of Victoria Land
Scott Coast